Oyen is a town in east-central Alberta, Canada near the Saskatchewan boundary and north of Medicine Hat.

Early name, Bishopburg, was changed in 1912 to honour Andrew Oyen, an early settler who sold his homestead for the townsite.

Oyen is the service centre for a large but sparsely populated dryland farming area. In the surrounding area wheat, barley, and canola are important crops, and beef cattle are raised.

Geography

Climate 
Oyen experiences a semi-arid climate (Köppen climate classification BSk). Winters are long, cold and dry, while summers are short and warm. Precipitation is low, with an annual average of 322 mm, and is heavily concentrated in the warmer months. Oyen's precipitation is narrowly below being a humid continental climate, a type it closely resembles in terms of yearly temperatures.

Demographics 

In the 2016 Census of Population conducted by Statistics Canada, the Town of Oyen recorded a population of 1,001 living in 400 of its 422 total private dwellings, a  change from its 2011 population of 973.

Attractions 
Oyen has a golf course and a local museum. Oyen also contains an arena, curling rink, and outdoor pool. Oyen is also home to the Badlands Badgers baseball academy for high school students.

Infrastructure 
A major highway rest stop is located north of the town at the junction of Highway 41 and Highway 9. It is developed with a service station, A&W restaurant, a motel and a visitor information centre operated by Travel Alberta. There is Oyen Municipal Airport nearby. Oyen also has a hospital.

Education 
Oyen is home to a regional public high school and a small Catholic elementary school. The high school is known as South Central High School (SCHS) with students grade seven to twelve. Oyen Public School (OPS) hosts students from kindergarten to grade nine. Assumption Roman Catholic school has students from kindergarten to grade six.

Notable people 

 Rick Strankman, Member of the Legislative Assembly of Alberta for Drumheller-Stettler, April 23, 2012 – April 16, 2019.

 Melody Davidson, head coach of the gold medal winning 2006 Winter Olympics and 2010 Winter Olympics Canadian women's hockey team, and director of the team that won gold in 2014.

See also 
List of communities in Alberta
List of towns in Alberta

References

External links 

1913 establishments in Alberta
Special Area No. 3
Towns in Alberta